Chiara Simionato (born 4 July 1975 in Treviso) is an Italian long track speed skater who competed in 2002 Winter Olympics and the 2006 Winter Olympics. She competed for Italy at the 2010 Winter Olympics in the women's 500m, 1000m, and 1500m.

Her sister is speed skater Paola Simionato.

References

External links 
 Chiara Simionato's website

Speed skaters at the 2002 Winter Olympics
Speed skaters at the 2006 Winter Olympics
Speed skaters at the 2010 Winter Olympics
Italian female speed skaters
Olympic speed skaters of Italy
1976 births
Living people
World Sprint Speed Skating Championships medalists